Acontista is a genus of mantises in the family Acanthopidae.

Species
Acontista amazonica
Acontista amoenula
Acontista aurantiaca
Acontista bolivari
Acontista brevipennis
Acontista cayennensis
Acontista championi
Acontista chopardi
Acontista concinna
Acontista cordillerae
Acontista cubana
Acontista ecuadorica
Acontista eximia
Acontista festae
Acontista fraterna
Acontista gracilis
Acontista inquinata
Acontista iriodes
Acontista maroniensis
Acontista mexicana
Acontista minima
Acontista multicolor
Acontista parva
Acontista piracicabensis
Acontista rehni
Acontista semirufa
Acontista vitrea

See also
List of mantis genera and species

References

Acanthopidae
Mantodea genera
Taxa named by Henri Louis Frédéric de Saussure